Sevan Marine ASA is specializing in design, engineering and project execution of floating units for offshore applications. The main product is cylinder platforms used for floating production and drilling.

The company is based in Arendal but also has office in Oslo and Singapore. Sevan Marine ASA is listed on Oslo Børs with ticker SEVAN.

References

External links

Companies established in 2001
Engineering companies of Norway
Companies based in Agder
Floating production storage and offloading vessel operators
Petroleum industry in Norway
Companies listed on the Oslo Stock Exchange